Josip Broz Tito Square (Russian: Площадь Иосипа Броз Тито) is a square in Moscow, close to the Profsoyuznaya metro station.

The square was named after the Yugoslav Communist leader Josip Broz Tito in 1981, one year after his death.

References

Squares in Moscow
Cultural depictions of Josip Broz Tito